Gileh may refer to:
 Gileh, Kurdistan
 Gileh, West Azerbaijan